Hamasen is a light rail station of the Circular Line of the Kaohsiung rapid transit system. It is located in Gushan District, Kaohsiung, Taiwan.

Before the extension to the Museum of Fine Arts railway station was opened, Hamasen was the northwestern terminus of the Circular Line. The station name is derived from Hamasen, the historic name of the area.

Station overview
The station is a street-level station with two side platforms. It is located inside Hamasen Railway Cultural Park.

Station layout

Around the station
 Sizihwan metro station
 Hamasen Railway Cultural Park
 Gushan Triangle Park
 Sky Balcony
 Da'an Park
 International Cruise Terminal
 Wude Martial Arts Center
 Shoushan LOVE Lookout
 Kaohsiung Martyrs' Shrine
 Xiziwan Tunnel (Old Shoushan Cave)
 Sizihwan Scenic Area
 National Sun Yat-sen University
 Sizhiwan Beach

References

2015 establishments in Taiwan
Circular light rail stations